is a Japanese professional footballer who plays as a defensive midfielder for J1 League club Sanfrecce Hiroshima.

Career
Taishi Matsumoto joined J1 League club Sanfrecce Hiroshima in 2017.

International career
On May 24 2019, Matsumoto was called up by Japan's head coach Hajime Moriyasu to feature in the Copa América played in Brazil.

Club statistics
.

Honours

Club
Sanfrecce Hiroshima
 J.League Cup: 2022

References

External links
Profile at Sanfrecce Hiroshima

1998 births
Living people
Association football people from Saitama Prefecture
Japanese footballers
J1 League players
Sanfrecce Hiroshima players
Association football midfielders
Footballers at the 2018 Asian Games
Asian Games silver medalists for Japan
Asian Games medalists in football
Medalists at the 2018 Asian Games